Dov I. Levine (דב לוין, born July 19, 1958) is an American-Israeli physicist, known for his research on quasicrystals, soft condensed matter physics (including granular materials, emulsions, and foams), and statistical mechanics out of equilibrium.

Education and career
The son of a professor of physical chemistry, Dov Levine grew up in New York. He graduated in 1979 with a B.S. from Stony Brook University and in 1986 with a Ph.D. in physics from the University of Pennsylvania. His Ph.D. thesis Quasicrystals: A New Class of Ordered Structure was supervised by Paul Steinhardt. 

In 1981, Levine and Steinhardt began developing their theory of a hypothetical new form of matter with icosahedral symmetry (or other forbidden symmetries) that violated the century-old laws of crystallography.  The idea, motivated by their study of Penrose tilings ,was to consider atomic arrangements that are quasiperiodic rather than periodic.  They introduced the term quasicrystals, short for quasiperiodic crystal, to describe the idea.  Independently, in April 1982,  while studying an aluminum-manganese alloy, A6Mn, Dan Shechtman made a scientific observation, published in 1984, of "a metallic solid which diffracts electrons like a single crystal but has a point group symmetry (icosahedral) that is inconsistent with lattice translations." When Levine and Steinhardt were shown a preprint, they recognized the diffraction pattern as matching their prediction for an icosahedral quasicrystal and, hence, published their theory and proposed that explanation.

According to Steinhardt:

Levine was from 1986 to 1988 a postdoctoral member of UCSB's ITP (now known as KIPT) and from 1988 to 1989 a visiting scientist at the Weizmann Institute. He was from 1988 to 1991 an assistant professor at the University of Florida. In 1990 he joined the physics department of the Technion, where he is now a professor of physics. For the academic year 1997–1998 he was a visiting member of UCSB's ITP.

In 2020 he published, with Shankar Ghosh and five other colleagues, research on the development of rechargeable N95 masks.

Awards and honors
 National Science Foundation Presidential Young Investigator Award
 Alon Fellowship at Tel Aviv University
 Minoru and Ethel Tsutsui Distinguished Graduate Research Award from the New York Academy of Sciences.
 With Paul Steinhardt and Alan Mackay, the Oliver E. Buckley Condensed Matter Prize
 2021 Fellow of the American Physical Society.

Selected publications
  (over 850 citations)
 
  (over 1050 citations)
  (over 350 citations)
 
 
  (over 1050 citations)
 
 
 
 
 
 
 
 
 
 
 
  (See Rudin–Shapiro sequence.)

See also
Biham–Middleton–Levine traffic model

References

1958 births
Living people
Stony Brook University alumni
University of Pennsylvania alumni
University of Florida faculty
Academic staff of Technion – Israel Institute of Technology
Condensed matter physicists
Israeli materials scientists
Israeli physicists
Jewish physicists
Oliver E. Buckley Condensed Matter Prize winners
Fellows of the American Physical Society
Quasicrystals
Scientists from New York City
American physicists